Laura Kinney (born X-23; codename Wolverine) is a fictional superhero appearing in media published by Marvel Entertainment, commonly in association with the X-Men. The character was created by writer Craig Kyle for the X-Men: Evolution television series in 2003, before debuting in the NYX comic series in 2004. Since then she has headlined two six-issue miniseries written by Kyle and Christopher Yost, a one-shot and self-titled series written by Marjorie Liu, and All-New Wolverine by Tom Taylor.

Laura was apparently the clone and later adoptive daughter of Wolverine, created to be the perfect killing machine. For years, she proved herself a capable assassin working for an organization called the Facility. A series of tragedies eventually led her to Wolverine and the X-Men. She attended school at the X-Mansion, and eventually became a member of X-Force. It is revealed later that she is not a clone, but biological daughter of Wolverine. Like her father, Laura has a regenerative healing factor and enhanced senses, speed, and reflexes. She also has retractable adamantium-coated bone claws in her hands and feet. In 2015, the character succeeded her father in adopting the name and costume of Wolverine in the series All-New Wolverine.

Laura Kinney has been described as one of Marvel's most notable and powerful female heroes.

The character has appeared in adaptations, including animated film and TV series and video games. She was portrayed by Dafne Keen in the 2017 film Logan.

History

Laura first appeared in season 3, episode 10 of the X-Men: Evolution animated television series, titled "X-23", voiced by Andrea Libman. She was later voiced by Britt Irvin in season 4, episode 3, titled "Target X".

Laura was created by Craig Kyle. He revealed that the character was his attempt to make a Wolverine to "connect more to the younger kids", as while X-Men: Evolution was a reinvention of the X-Men making the characters teenagers, "Wolverine was one of the old, grizzled guys". The characterization went for the opposite of Wolverine, where instead of a man "older than we know" with no memory of his past and the life that he lost, Laura Kinney was a young girl "shackled to the murders she's committed" whose entire life revolved around the project that made her a killer. Kyle added that the character is "Pinocchio for Marvel Comics, she's a samurai sword trying to become a real little girl". He and Christopher Yost were the writers of the two episodes of X-Men: Evolution in which Laura appears ("X-23" and "Target X"), with Yost stating that Kyle "had all the beats of her origin in his head when I came on board".

Transition to comic books and publication history
Laura Kinney's comic debut was in 2004 in the series NYX, where her history and past were never divulged but her abilities were showcased. In X-23, her first miniseries, her origin was fully explained. She became part of the X-Men supporting cast in Uncanny X-Men #450.

Craig Kyle and Christopher Yost also scripted X-23: Innocence Lost, a six-issue miniseries that details the character's origin, as well as X-23: Target X, a six-issue miniseries that covers the character's experiences between her origin story and her appearance in NYX. They continued to write for the character into their runs on New X-Men and X-Force as a member of the teams.

Laura Kinney starred in a monthly comic book series in 2010, written by Marjorie Liu. The series was prompted by the success of Liu's one-shot X-23 from earlier in the year. On November 15, 2011, Marvel announced that the X-23 Volume 3 comic series would end at issue #21.

Laura Kinney appeared as a regular character in Avengers Academy from issue #23 (Feb 2012) through its final issue #39 (Jan 2013), and also appears in Avengers Arena, a series by Dennis Hopeless and Kev Walker.

Laura joins the All-New X-Men in Issue 19 after the team finds her in Florida being chased by anti-mutant religious zealots.

In June 2015, it was announced that following that year's "Secret Wars" storyline, Laura would take on the Wolverine mantle, as the main character in the series All-New Wolverine, by writer Tom Taylor and artist David López, and wearing a costume resembling Wolverine's.

After the return of Logan, Laura's title was relaunched as the fourth X-23 volume and written by Mariko Tamaki and drawn by Juann Cabal. Tamaki said, "This is a story about being in the very weird kind of family that someone like Laura finds herself in. It's about what it means to wrestle with legacy and identity when you were created to be a weapon and not someone with a birthday and a sister." The series ran for 12 issues before ending in May 2019.

In 2018, Laura—once again under the mantle of Wolverine—and her sister Gabby Kinney joined Jean Grey's X-Men Red team, written by Tom Taylor and illustrated by Mahmud Asrar. The series received critical acclaim, with several critics citing it as one of the best comics of the year.

As part of the Dawn of X relaunch of all X-Men-related titles, Laura joined the newest Fallen Angels series written by Bryan Edward Hill and drawn by Szymon Kudranski. The series ended after 6 issues.

Fictional character biography

Innocence Lost

A top-secret program is tasked to replicate the original Weapon X experiment that bonded adamantium to the skeleton of Wolverine. The project is taken in a new direction: Dr. Martin Sutter recruits renowned mutant geneticist Dr. Sarah Kinney to develop a clone of Wolverine. Also on the team is Sutter's protege, Dr. Zander Rice, who was raised by Sutter after his father was killed by the original Weapon X.

Since the only genetic sample from Weapon X is damaged, Kinney is unable to salvage the Y chromosome. Kinney proposes the creation of a female genetic twin. Her request is denied; Rice is opposed to the idea. After 22 failed attempts at reconstituting the DNA using a duplicate X chromosome, the 23rd sample yields a viable sample to combine with an embryo. Although Kinney is allowed to proceed, Rice exacts revenge for her insubordination by forcing her to act as the surrogate mother of the specimen. For nine months, Kinney's every move is monitored. Finally, she gives birth to "X-23".

After seven years, Rice subjects X-23 to radiation poisoning to activate her mutant gene. He extracts her claws, coats them with adamantium, and reinserts them back into her hands and feeta procedure performed without affording the child any anesthetic. Rice creates a "trigger scent" that drives X-23 into a murderous rage when she detects it. X-23 is then trained to be a hired assassin, ordered to kill "anyone ... everyone ... for a price."

Kinney's niece Megan is abducted by a serial killer; she smuggles X-23 out of the facility to rescue her. X-23 tracks the abductor to his apartment, kills him, and frees Megan. Kinney is fired when she returns and is escorted off the base. Shortly thereafter, Rice assigns X-23 to eliminate Sutter and his family. He orders her to keep it secret. X-23 reveals to Sarah that Rice is responsible for the murders. Before Kinney leaves, Rice reveals a chamber containing the incubation pods for subjects X-24 through X-50.

Kinney drafts a letter to her daughter, assigning her a final mission: destroy the pods and kill Rice. X-23 succeeds and meets her mother, and they prepare to flee. However, prior to his death, Rice exposes Kinney to the trigger scent. X-23 goes into a murderous frenzy and kills her mother. As she lies dying, Kinney tells X-23 that her name is Laura and that she loves her, and hands her the letter and pictures of Charles Xavier, Wolverine, and the Xavier Institute.

Target X

After being arrested by S.H.I.E.L.D. agents, Laura awakens bound and gagged in the company of Captain America and Matt Murdock, who proceed to interrogate her about her past. Laura describes how she traveled to San Francisco and tracked down Megan and Debbie (her mother's sister). Introducing herself as Sarah's daughter, she moves in with them. Although Megan experiences vivid nightmares of her abduction, her family believes these to be utter fantasies. Laura informs Megan that the man in her nightmares was indeed real and that she killed him.

Debbie's boyfriend turns out to be an agent for the Facility who has been instructed to manipulate Laura into killing Megan and Debbie using the trigger scent to activate "X-23". The agent fumbles the assignment by spilling the trigger scent on himself and is killed by Laura. Facility agents storm the house, led by the woman who served as Laura's handler as X-23, Kimura, who had treated her harshly in the facility, punishing her even if the missions went according to plan.

Laura manages to get Megan and Debbie to safety by handcuffing Kimura to a radiator and then triggering an explosion in the house, buying some time. After Laura and Megan part, Laura decides to confront the man who made her creation possible, Wolverine. Laura tracks Wolverine to Xavier's mansion and engages him in a battle, defeating him using tactics and maneuverability. She does not kill Wolverine, instead telling him why she came. Wolverine reveals that he is aware of Laura's ordeal, having received a detailed letter from her mother. The talk is then interrupted when S.H.I.E.L.D. agents led by Captain America come to arrest Laura.

Despite the mayhem in her past, Matt Murdock accepts Laura's innocence. Captain America wants Laura to atone for the murders she has committed, but ultimately frees her both due to realizing the true situation of her brainwashing, and to avoid S.H.I.E.L.D. exploiting her as their own weapon. He takes Laura to a bus station and tells Laura to return to Logan. While on the bus, Laura pulls out letters from her mother and begins shedding tears as she reads them.

NYX
Laura surfaces in New York City and is again brainwashed, this time by a pimp named Zebra Daddy who exploits her as a prostitute catering to sadomasochistic patrons. In her spare time, Laura continues to cut herself with her own claws; unable to free herself from Zebra Daddy's control, she becomes mute and withdrawn. Upon meeting Kiden Nixon, a young mutant with the ability to freeze time when in danger, and Tatiana Caban, a mutant who can take on the physical attributes of whoever and whatever she comes into contact with via their blood, X-23 starts to come to her senses. Although she runs away from Zebra Daddy, he tracks her down. With the aid of her new-found friends (and the mutant named Bobby Soul), Zebra Daddy and his thugs are defeated: Laura kills him to save the lives of her friends. Laura abandons her new friends, but years later would eventually bump into them one last time when on an investigation with Wolverine.

X-Men

Laura takes a job as a waitress at the mutant-themed "Wannabee's" nightclub in the Mutant Town district of New York. She defends Jade Parisi, daughter of mob boss Don Parisi, against some thugs who berate her for having a mutant boyfriend. Laura kills some of the thugs and helps Jade escape and go into hiding. The deaths inadvertently implicate Wolverine, prompting his teammates to investigate. Laura attacks Wolverine on sight, but he eventually calms her down. She leads the X-Men to Parisi's daughter. After aiding the X-Men against Parisi's mutant enforcer Geech, Laura flees the scene. This encounter is later revealed to be partially arranged between Laura and Wolverine in order for her to encounter and ally with the X-Men without revealing her past.

She later returns to help the X-Men save victims of a car accident, after which she is enrolled at the Xavier Institute and assigned a room with Rachel Summers and Kitty Pryde. Laura behaves protectively towards Wolverine, observing him on the mansion's security monitors and even attacking his teammate Bishop after he floors Wolverine during a training session.

During one of her sessions at the mansion's monitors, an anomalous energy spike prompts Laura to investigate. She encounters Spider-Man at the source of the signal; mistaking him for an enemy, she attacks him. The pair ultimately team up to save the young mutant Paul Patterson from an alternate reality version of Iron Man known as Iron Maniac. The arrival of Captain America and the super-spy Black Widow help turn the tide, with Spider-Man and Laura destroying Iron Maniac's equipment using their own version of the classic Fastball Special.

Laura secretly follows Wolverine on his investigation of strange activity in the Canadian Rockies. Ambushed by the Hauk'ka, evolved Saurians from the Savage Land, Laura manages to escape and alert the X-Men. Traveling to the Savage Land, Laura and the X-Men team-up with the Savage Land's lord Ka-Zar and his allies, the Savage Land Mutates, to prevent the Hauk'ka from destroying human civilization by exerting control over the weather-manipulating X-Man, Storm.

Captain Universe
Laura is later empowered by the cosmic Uni-Power to become Captain Universe. She quickly learns that A.I.M. is seeking the Uni-Power in hopes of using it against their enemies. She agrees to help the Uni-Power, and travels with a S.H.I.E.L.D. agent called the Scorpion to a secret A.I.M. hideout. There, they discover information on the Uni-Power that is being transferred to another facility. The Scorpion attempts to copy the information, but is stopped by Laura. The Scorpion is then ordered to take her into custody, but covers for her instead and allows Laura to escape. At the close of the issue, the Uni-Power bids farewell to Laura, and parts ways with her.

Decimation
After the events of "House of M" and "Decimation", Laura was one of the few mutants to retain her powers. Having previously left the institute off-panel, she returns to the X-Mansion at Wolverine's insistence. Laura develops an attraction towards Julian Keller, aka Hellion. Following a bombing at the school by anti-mutant religious zealot Reverend William Stryker, Laura confronts Stryker at his compound, and kills three of his Purifiers, rescuing her comrades.

When Surge receives a distress call from Forge, Laura accompanies the New X-Men. Although the team disables the Nimrod unit, Laura is grievously wounded and is unable to heal herself. To save Laura, Hellion convinces Emma Frost to unlock his telekinetic potential, increasing his powers (and thus, his speed) to a level thought impossible by an O.N.E. sentinel guard. This allows them to fly back to the mansion in time for Laura to be healed by Elixir.

Mercury Falling
While Laura is bonding over coffee with Cessily, the cafe is attacked by Kimura and her minions, who in turn capture Cessily. After Laura returns to the school, she and Hellion go off to locate the Facility's whereabouts. Laura interrogates a man at gun point, and upon securing the information, shoots him in the head. Hellion informs her that killing will no longer be a part of their interrogation technique.

Laura and Hellion infiltrate the Facility and after an encounter with Kimura, the two soon find Cessily in liquid form, barely able to compose herself. They are attacked by Predator X, who has absorbed Cessily's liquid mercury skin. Laura and Hellion decide to fall back, but are pursued by the Predators. The group is once again ambushed, only to be rescued by the Astonishing X-Men and New X-Men. The two teams turn the tables on the attackers, and defeat the remaining facility troops. During the scuffle, the remaining Predator escapes.

Sometime later, Emma Frost finds Kimura trying to assassinate Laura, and confronts her, erasing the one happy moment in Kimura's life from her memory, and psychically suggesting that Kimura's assignment now is to hunt down the remaining members of the Facility and kill them.

Messiah Complex
Cyclops, assembles a new incarnation X-Force team that includes Laura, Wolverine, Wolfsbane, Caliban, Warpath, and Hepzibah. During the team's confrontation with Lady Deathstrike, Laura nearly kills her in revenge for Deathstrike's attack upon Hellion. Laura also saves Wolverine's life by killing Scrambler just before he scrambled Wolverine's healing factor.

Following the event of "Messiah Complex", Cyclops forms a black ops incarnation of X-Force to deal with threats preemptively. He drafts Laura Kinney for this team, though this puts him into conflict with Wolverine, whom he did not consult on this decision prior. Wolverine asks Laura to reconsider this, warning her of the life she is giving up should she continue on this path, but Laura ultimately decides to take her place on this team. Her conflict with Wolverine recurs over his observation that she is reckless with the lives of others.

Messiah War
The X-Men moved to San Francisco, where they are accepted as heroes by the mayor, having rejected the Fifty State Initiative. Laura is finally reunited with Kiden Nixon, who herself makes her first appearance outside the NYX series. This future version of Kiden is revealed to be a disruptor of time travel technology, which threatens to trap X-Force, Cable and Hope in this era. While Laura agonizes over whether to kill Kiden, Domino fatally shoots Kiden herself. In a subsequent storyline, Laura goes back in time to save Boom Boom when Domino and Proudstar are neutralized. During the course of this mission, Laura's left arm is severed from her body. She is rescued by the X-Force, leading into the 2009 - 2010 "Necrosha" storyline, which sees Laura reunited with her friends from the NYX series.

"Second Coming"
Laura is shown to be part of Cyclops' "Alpha Roster" in the course of the "Second Coming" story arc. Along with the most of X-Force, Laura accompanies Cable and Cypher to the future in an attempt to shut down the Nimrod invasion. Following Cypher successfully over-riding the programming, Laura attempts to return through the temporal portal, only to sustain horrific injuries. The portal prevents any organic matter traveling through it. This leads Cable to sacrifice himself, allowing his techno-organic virus to overwhelm him, forcing the portal open and making it possible for the team to return to Utopia.

In the fallout of "Second Coming", Wolverine cuts Laura from the team, explaining to her that after a lifetime of following orders from others, she needs to learn to make her own choices and follow her own path. Laura subsequently tracks former Weapon X scientist Detlef Metzger, intending to capture him before he can perform experiments using a vial of Wolverine's blood. Instead, Metzger is kidnapped by a group of US soldiers, while Laura notices that Daken has been watching her.

X-23

In X-23 Laura begins having horrible nightmares for mysterious reasons, then finds herself on a journey to self-discovery and begins a friendship with Gambit. They eventually travel to Madripoor to find clues to her nightmares. Laura continues having strange dreams once again, this time about a strange symbol, so she befriends the Fantastic Four and gets the job of babysitting Reed and Susan Storm's children Franklin and Valeria.

X-23: Girls Night Out
Laura is asked by Wolverine to join his side. She replies by asking if there is any other choice. While she thinks about what choice she will make, Laura goes for a walk with Jubilee and asks her why she chose Cyclops' side. Jubilee tells her she chose to stay with Cyclops because, as a vampire, she can hear the heartbeat of everyone around her, and it makes her hungry and wants to eat them. Laura tells her that she will not hurt them but Jubilee tells her that the urge is there and that she needs to fight as much she needs blood. She cannot be with Wolverine because she is afraid to violate his new philosophy: if you are a kid you do not fight, and he sees her as a kid. Jubilee tells Laura that Logan sees her the same way, they both agree that it sucks. Laura's phone rings as the others need an answer, but they ignore it and Jubilee tells Laura to go and have some fun and dance. Laura explains that she cannot dance, but Jubilee tells her it does not matter because she is hot. Laura tells her she is not hot. However, as they go, someone follows them. While Jubilee was dancing, Laura becomes distracted by looking at someone and recognized him as the person who took over Zebra Daddy's operation. She and Jubilee attack him and his men and take the girl who was with him since she knew where the other girls were and how to free them. As they think about what to do with the girls, because they cannot just call the police, the Black Widow and some S.H.I.E.L.D. agents appear and take the girls to help them. Natasha offers Laura to come to the Avengers Academy and she accepts. The next day she tells Logan what happened, and Wolverine tells her he is going to miss her and he is sorry he could not do better by her. She tells him she is going to miss him too, then she takes a motorcycle and drives to the academy.

Avengers Academy
Following the "Fear Itself" storyline, Laura appears as one of the students at the new Avengers Academy. The academy sees she does not need any combat training after she fought Tigra. After she introduced herself to the other students, she explained to Mettle the difference between killing an innocent and killing to protect an innocent, telling him that he is not a psycho killer, and that they can talk more about it another time. This makes Hazmat feel jealous. Finesse became friends with Laura due to their lack of emotion. Finesse also stood by Laura when she opposed the X-Men locking their students on the academy grounds during Avengers vs. X-Men. However, their friendship took a turn for the worse when Jeremy Briggs tried to release a superhuman cure. After Briggs took out Laura and tried to acid burn her, Finesse grabs Laura's arms and fatally stabs Briggs in the radial and femoral arteries, making him bleed to death. Laura first thought she killed him, but when she finds out it was Finesse, she was furious. Laura agrees to keep Finesse's secret, but declares they are no longer friends, upsetting Finesse.

Avengers Arena
After Avengers vs. X-Men and the conclusion of Avengers Academy, Laura was part of the students abducted by Arcade in Avengers Arena. Arcade turns them loose for 30 days in Murderworld to fight for survival. In a flash forward, it is shown that on the penultimate day, she attacks Hazmat and is badly burned, but the results are unknown as the flash forward then ends. The academy students set up camp and face off against the Runaways when Chase is framed, but Laura is soon separated from Reptil and Hazmat when Arcade covers the group in trigger scent and Reptil evacuates Hazmat. Laura then finds Justin and helps him strip down his Sentinel. When Apex kills Justin and takes his Sentinel, Laura goes to track them and get them back. After nearly being killed by Apex, Arcade unleashes trigger scent on all of Murderworld to send Laura in a berserker rage, at which point she injures Hazmat, as seen in the flash forward. Cullen turns into a giant monster and fights Laura, defeating her and powering her down from her rage. After that, Laura continues to injure Hazmat until Anachronism steps in, angry over Nara's death and holding Laura responsible, attacking Laura and inadvertently saving Hazmat. By this point, most of Laura's body is badly burned with radiation, and she is still in this state when the competition ends and Nico, Chase, Cammi, Deathlocket, and Anachronism call Hank Pym, Abigail Brand, Maria Hill, Captain Britain, and Wolverine to pick up the kids. Laura is loaded onto a SHIELD helicopter and is taken away to parts unknown, ending her affiliation with the Avengers Academy.

All-New X-Men

Unlike the other Arena survivors, Laura did not join the group in infiltrating the Masters of Evil. After the events of Avengers Arena, Laura is found by Kitty Pryde and the time-displaced original X-Men. She is amnesiac and being hunted by the Purifiers.

After being found by Kitty, Laura was taken to their base to recover. When Laura wakes up, with her memories now returning, at the former Weapon X facility she immediately tries to escape. Teen Cyclops goes to talk to her, while he's gone Teen Jean mentions to the team that Teen Cyclops "fancies" Laura. As Laura makes it outside she's met by Teen Cyclops, who was waiting for her. Teen Cyclops tries to calm her down but Laura only ceases hostility after getting Teen Cyclops scent and figuring out that Teen Cyclops is who he says he is.

The two talk, with Laura telling him that she doesn't want to talk about her past or what happened to her. Suddenly Teen Cyclops awkwardly hugs her, when she was distracted and looking sad, because he thought she needed a hug. Laura tells him that she doesn't do hugs, especially not with an audience as Kitty, Teen Jean, and Teen Beast were watching them. Teen Jean expressed a very conflicted look upon her face due to the hug and having read part of Laura's mind, thus she knows what happened in Avengers Arena. Laura thanks them for helping her and suggests they take the fight to the Purifiers, but in order for her to track them down, they'll have to return her to where they found her.

Upon finding the Purifier base they immediately set out to attack them. However, the fight doesn't go well and the entire team is knocked unconscious by Stryker Jr. when Teen Jean learns too late that Stryker Jr. has powers of his own. Laura is also with the All-New X-Men when Teen Jean is abducted by the Shi'ar and the X-Men team up with the Guardians of the Galaxy to save her. Later, she is attacked by Raze, who disguises himself as her to infiltrate Cyclops's base. She subsequently begins to date the younger Angel, and meets Jimmy Hudson—the son of the Wolverine of the Ultimate Marvel universe—when the team are transferred into the Ultimate Universe by accident. She and the All-New X-Men team up again with the Guardians of the Galaxy  in search of The Black Vortex, during which Angel submits himself to the Vortex and almost dies, but instead is granted golden light wings. She asks him why he endangered himself, and he tells her that he wanted to change himself so he won't turn into Archangel and that he can stay himself forever since he is in love with her.

All-New Wolverine

The series opens approximately eight months after "Secret Wars", and reveals that her healing factor is working normally again after having been drained by Siphon in the Nexus of All Realities.

The Hunt for Wolverine
During the Hunt for Wolverine storyline, Laura attends a disguised black market auction in a submarine off the coast of Guam. After a disguised Tony Stark wins the genetic material of Luke Cage and Jessica Jones' daughter Danielle Cage in the auction, she advises Tony Stark to drop out of the auction afterwards. When the unidentified seller of the genetic material meets with Tony Stark, he is attacked by Mister Sinister for stealing the genetic material of the original Wolverine. Laura sheds her disguise and assists Iron Man in fighting Mister Sinister, slicing off Mister Sinister's left hand. Iron Man finds information in Mister Sinister's database which reveals that part of her genetic material was provided by Sarah Kinney, the scientist who created her and carried her to term. This makes her the biological daughter of both Sarah and Logan, and not strictly a clone.

X-23 (vol. 4)

Laura briefly returns to the X-23 codename as she, her sister Gabby, and their pet Jonathan go on an adventure to prevent others from being experimented on.

X-Men Red
Laura—once again under the mantle of Wolverine—and her sister Gabby Kinney appeared as members of Jean Grey's X-Men Red team.

Fallen Angels
Laura Kinney joins young Cable and Kwannon on a hunt to find the evil Japanese spirit Apoth that is attacking mutants.

Powers and abilities
Laura was apparently a female clone (later revealed as his biological daughter) created from Wolverine's genetic material. Consequently, her mutant powers are similar to his. Like Wolverine, Laura's primary mutant ability is an accelerated healing factor that allows her to regenerate damaged or destroyed tissues with far greater speed, efficiency, and finality than ordinary humans are capable of. Injuries such as gunshot wounds, slashes, and puncture wounds completely heal within a matter of seconds. She has also been shown to be able to reattach limbs; for example, she reattached her hand after she severed it to escape the restraints placed on her by Kimura. The effects of her accelerated healing powers extend to her body's immune system, rendering her immune to disease and infection. She is also immune to most drugs and toxins, although she can be affected by certain drugs if given sufficient dosage. Given the regenerative nature of her cells, she is potentially-immortal, just like her father.

Laura's mutant healing factor heightened her physical senses, speed, agility, reflexes/reactions, balance, and endurance to superhuman levels. Like Wolverine, Laura possesses retractable claws sheathed within her forearms. She releases the claws through the tissue of her knuckles, leaving small wounds which are healed by her healing factor. Unlike Wolverine, however, Laura has only two claws per hand which are her primary weapons of offence. She also possesses a single, retractable claw housed within each foot which she tends to use for defense. The claws were forcefully extracted by Zander Rice, sharpened, coated with adamantium, and reinserted into her body. Laura escaped before the procedure to fuse her entire skeleton with adamantium could be performed. Since the claws are laced with adamantium, they are virtually unbreakable and are capable of cutting almost any substance.

In addition to her own innate powers and skills, Laura has twice been the host of the Enigma Force, providing her with many special abilities particular to the entity. She is the first mutant to be chosen by the entity as its host, as well as being one of a handful of individuals to do so more than once. At the end of their second encounter, the Enigma Force named Laura as the heir to its power. This permanent association was first indicated by a mark appearing on the palm of her right hand at the conclusion of the "Killing Dream" arc of her solo series.

Born and raised in captivity, Laura has been trained to become a living weapon. She is highly trained in the use of long range weapons and explosives and is a formidable hand-to-hand combatant, with intensive training in numerous armed and unarmed martial arts techniques. She has also been subjected to conditioning in which a specific "trigger scent" has been used to send her into a berserker rage, killing anything in sight; Emma Frost is unsure if this will ever be fully suppressed. She has displayed fluency in French and Japanese, and Zander Rice once described her intellect as being "off the charts".

Relationships

Wolverine
Laura and Logan talk and interact with each other in ways that are consistent with a father-daughter relationship (even though in New X-Men, Logan introduced her to the students as his sister). Logan acts protectively towards Laura and seems to have her well-being at heart, such as when he openly voiced his disapproval of Cyclops putting her on X-Force; he, however, did not force her to leave, though he told Gambit that he thinks he should have. When the pair first meet, Logan offers to help her start over at the Xavier Institute and says that he knows better than anyone what she is going through. Iron Man's recent research confirmed that Logan is actually Laura's biological father, rather than just being a female clone of Logan. After Logan's death, Laura officially adopts his codename of 'Wolverine' to honor his memory.

Sarah Kinney
Sarah was the first one to show Laura any sort of affection in spite of her orders from the Facility to not treat her like a child. Sarah would frequently read her Pinocchio as a child and showed concern when she noticed the cuts Laura inflicted on herself. It took Laura sparing the life of Henry Sutter for Sarah to realize that she was just as guilty of using Laura as the rest of the Facility was. Deciding to make things right, Sarah hatched a plan to escape with Laura, destroy the Facility's work, and start over with her. However, thanks to Zander Rice lacing the trigger scent on her, Sarah was killed by Laura. With her dying breaths, Sarah tells "X-23" her name is Laura. Sarah's final thoughts were left in a letter to Laura detailing her guilt, that she was Laura's mother, and the realization that she had come to love her. Sarah's death remains to this day the life that Laura regrets taking the most. Iron Man's recent research confirmed that Sarah is actually Laura's biological mother, rather than just being a surrogate. Writer Marjorie Liu has stated that she intended for Laura to be part Asian through her mother.

Megan Kinney
Laura's cousin on her mother's side. After escaping from the Facility Laura moved in with Sarah's sister Debbie and her daughter Megan. For a time the two connected and Megan even admitted to Laura being her best friend. However, when Facility agents came to take Laura back, Laura helped them escape and make new identities so that they could hide. Laura and Megan then went their separate ways and have not heard from each other since, though Megan remains one of the people closest to Laura's heart. In the 18th issue of All-New Wolverine, after killing Kimura by drowning her, Laura finds Megan's hideout and says they (Megan and Debbie) don't have to hide anymore.

Kiden Nixon
A homeless mutant from New York City. Laura and Kiden met each other when Laura was a prostitute under the pimp Zebra Daddy. Kiden helped Laura to escape from her life as a prostitute and quickly befriended her though at this point Laura had difficulty speaking. Laura recounts in the X-23 One Shot, that Kiden and her friends did not know or care that she was a weapon. To them, Laura was their friend and part of their gang. Laura parts ways with them at the end of the one shot, returning with Wolverine. They leave on good terms, and Kiden says that Laura will always have a place with them.

Hellion
The first boy that Laura formed a crush on. At first Hellion was hostile towards her, but during the Mercury Rising arc the two grew closer. Mercury managed to pick up on Laura's feelings towards him though she did not get Laura to admit to it. Over time Hellion/Julian began to feel the same way, though their relationship never managed to get much further. When Julian lost his hands during Second Coming, Laura stayed by him, watching him recover. After the Misadventures in Babysitting arc Laura ended things between her and Julian saying that she no longer felt the same way towards him.

Gambit
Gambit traveled with Laura during the X-23 solo series. The two became friends and looked out for one another as Gambit helped her to cope with the changes in her life as well as giving her helpful life advice. He affectionately referred to her as "Petite" and even managed to get her to calm down from a trigger scent-induced rage. Gambit scolded Logan for not protecting Laura the way he protected Jubilee, to which Logan admitted to his failings as Laura's father. Gambit also went on to remark that Laura, while damaged, was far from being broken, contrary to everyone's perceptions of her. If Laura was truly broken she would not be trying to change. Logan later on thanked Gambit for succeeding with Laura where he failed. When Laura left to join to the Avengers Academy, she and Gambit shared a goodbye hug and he told her wherever she went she was not alone.

Jubilee
During the Touching Darkness arc of the X-23 series, Gambit had Wolverine come by to help Laura. Logan had brought Jubilee with him and Laura attacked her on sight due to her being a vampire. Though after getting some space between the two girls things managed to calm down. Laura had some jealousy towards Jubilee from the X-23 one shot as Logan treated her more like a daughter than he did her. Laura tried to bait Jubilee into killing her by slicing her neck open and counting on her bloodlust, though Jubilee managed to stop herself after witnessing one of Laura's memories. After talking things out, the two realized how much alike they were and became friends.

Daken
Logan/Wolverine's son and the closest thing Laura has to a brother. Daken is to Laura what Sabretooth is to Wolverine, her opposite. Even though Laura admits that she and Daken are related by blood, the two do not initially see each other as family. Laura had fought with Daken when the Dark Avengers under Norman Osborn invaded Utopia. They did not truly meet until Laura and Gambit came to Madripoor looking to track down Malcolm Colcord. At first Daken does not believe that she is a clone of his father, until Laura reveals her claws. Daken berates her for coming to Madripoor and remarks that they are nothing alike. The two square off until Daken decides to offer his assistance, which Laura rejects. When Daken confronts Colcord about his plans to restart Weapon X, he reveals his subterfuge at leading Laura and Gambit to Colcord, though this turns out be a ruse as well, as he incapacitates Gambit and helps Colcord capture Laura. Daken learns about Laura's past from Colcord and assists in her escape from her cell. He remarks that Laura is a construct, to which Laura retorts that he is just like her: Just like the Facility made Laura into a weapon, so did Romulus do to Daken, to which he responds that he owns his own fate. The two then enter a brief mutual alliance to destroy Colcord's new project. Before they part ways, Daken asks Laura why she does not seek power when she could easily have it. Laura remarks that what she has to prove has nothing to do with power, and then asks Daken why he seeks more power when he already has it. Daken remarks that power is all he has. Laura's encounter with Daken makes her realize that she owns her fate and can do with it what she wants. Daken does not seem to have the same hate towards Laura that he does with Logan, and by the time of later series such as Wolverines, he even begins to demonstrate affection towards her. In Reign of X and later stories, he actively refers to Laura as his sister along with Gabby.

Angel
Prior to the Secret Wars storyline, Laura began a relationship with the time-displaced teenaged Warren Worthington III, which persisted after she took on the Wolverine codename. However, Warren clashed with her several times about her increasing recklessness. Following a brutal beating she received from Blob, he decided to end the relationship to make a point about the unnecessary risks she was taking. The two, however, reconciled after having come to understand each other's feelings.

Psylocke (Betsy Braddock)
Laura and Psylocke became quite friendly with each other on their first meeting in The Uncanny X-Men #456, shortly after Psylocke came back to life. Both girls seemed to share an enjoyment in fighting. In one instance, Laura was knocked out while Psylocke continued, upon awakening Laura saw all the enemies had disappeared and when she asked Psylocke what happened, Betsy joked that she ate them, to which Laura replied it was cool. Another shared moment was when Betsy and Laura discussed her coming back to life, which Laura didn't see as unique since she herself had died repeatedly when she was experimented on to test her healing factor, but she always "got better". When Psylocke asked how that made her feel, Laura smiled and said she killed them, and they didn't get better. Betsy then smiled and wrapped her arm around Laura's shoulder, saying she had some very definite possibilities. There have also been images of Laura imitating Betsy, including braiding her hair and mimicking her poses.

Gabby Kinney
In the first arc of All-New Wolverine Laura learned that Alchemax genetics had created ten clones of her. All but four of the clones died in captivity, either during training or as a result of tests of a nanotech weapon that was slowly breaking down their bodies. Two others died during the escape; one who committed suicide after Laura foiled her attempt to assassinate Robert Chandler's son, and a second killed by Chandler's lead enforcer. The last two Sisters — Gabby and Bellona — survived. Laura took Gabby in and adopted her as her sister, taking it upon herself to give her the family Laura herself never had with Logan, in hopes of helping her find the right path. Much like Laura, Gabby possesses a regenerative healing factor and bone claws, however she only has a single claw in each hand. Additionally, as a result of the nanites in her blood Gabby does not feel pain. She eventually adopted a super-hero code name, Honey Badger, given by her brother Daken. She eventually gave the name up to become Scout.

Cultural impact and legacy

Critical reception 
Jamie Lovett of Comicbook.com stated, "X-23 is one a great handful of crossover characters who began in animation and were so well-liked by fans that they eventually made their way into comics. [...] Through the mentorship of Logan himself and the friendship of characters like Gambit, Jubilee, Angel, and her Laura's own clone, Gabby, Laura has become a fully fleshed out character in control of her own destiny. When Logan died, X-23 mourned. When she was done mourning, she did what now seems like what she was alway destined to do. She became Wolverine, and she fills that role as well as her predecessor, if not better at times." David Harth of CBR.com wrote, "Known for years as X-23, she proved herself on the hero scene before taking over as Wolverine after Logan's death. She proved to be amazing at it and has since become Wolverine again, working with the X-Men. Fans have watched Wolverine grow for years, evolving from a lab created killing machine to a well-rounded human being. She's gained a legion of fans since then and stepped onto the biggest mutant stage and impressed." Maddy Myers of The Mary Sue said, "The reason why X-23’s story is compelling to me is not because she’s a grim-dark teen killing machine, although that did speak to me when I was a depressed teenage girl. These days, her story resonates with me because it ends in self-acceptance and self-actualization. She gets to work with X-Men of various ages, decide which parental and authority figures are worth her trust, make new friends her own age, build a new family of her own with Logan and her “sister” clones, and – the cherry on top – she becomes the Wolverine! It’s a triumphant story that has been going on for about a decade, and it would be amazing to bring it to more audiences who aren’t as familiar with." Andy L. Kubai of Screen Rant asserted, "One of the most interesting characters to arrive since the original James Howlett is Laura Kinney, a.k.a. X-23. A female clone of Logan, she’s a Wolverine through and through, who first came to light via the short-lived animated series, X-Men: Evolution (2000). Creators Christopher Yost and Craig Kyle sought to capture younger viewers with a teenaged “Wolverine,” and they succeeded. Laura snowballed in popularity, transitioning into the comic book realm in 2004 and landing several limited series and team books (like X-Force and New X-Men), as well as a current ongoing series."

Accolades 

 In 2015, Entertainment Weekly ranked Laura Kinney 70th in their "Let's rank every X-Man ever" list.
 In 2017, Comicbook.com ranked Laura Kinney 2nd in their "Every Wolverine In The Marvel Universe Ranked" list.
 In 2018, CBR.com ranked Laura Kinney 3rd in their "20 Deadliest X-Men Clones" list, 7th in their "X-Force: 20 Powerful Members Ranked From Weakest To Strongest" list, and 6th in their "15 Most Lethal Weapon X Members" list.
 In 2018, CBR.com ranked X-23 15th in their "8 X-Men Kids Cooler Than Their Parents (And 7 Who Are Way Worse)" list.
 In 2018, CBR.com ranked X-23 7th in their "X-Force: 20 Powerful Members" list.
 In 2019, CNET ranked Laura Kinney 4th in their "Female Marvel superheroes who deserve their own shows" list.
 In 2020, Scary Mommy included Laura Kinney in their "Looking For A Role Model? These 195+ Marvel Female Characters Are Truly Heroic" list.
 In 2021, Screen Rant ranked Laura Kinney 7th in their "10 Most Powerful Members Of X-Force" list.
 In 2022, Sportskeeda ranked Laura Kinney 1st in their "5 best alternate versions of Wolverine" list.
 In 2022, Screen Rant ranked Laura Kinney 5th in their "Top 10 X-Men, Ranked by Fighting Skills" list and included her in their "10 Most Powerful Versions Of Wolverine" list.
 In 2022, CBR.com ranked Laura Kinney 2nd in their "10 Best Marvel Legacy Heroes" list, 2nd in their "Wolverine's Children, Ranked By Likeability" list, and 10th in their "10 Most Powerful Female X-Men" list.

Literary reception

Volumes

X-23 - 2005 
In 2005, Marvel Comics announced that X-23 #1 sold out.

All-New Wolverine - 2015 
According to Diamond Comic Distributors, All-New Wolverine #1 was the 10th best selling comic book in November 2015.

Matt Little of CBR.com called All-New Wolverine #1 a "fresh take on the legacy of "Wolverine" that fans will enjoy," asserting, "All-New Wolverine #1 is a good Wolverine comic; it's full of explosions and slashing and punching, the kind of stuff you want when you say to yourself, "Hey, I want to read a Wolverine comic." Tom Taylor, who's made a name for himself with mad violent stories like DC's "Injustice: Gods Among Us," knows how to ratchet up tension and deliver a high caliber action sequence, which is what you get in the first issue. It's a set piece that throws readers right into the middle of the action and catches them up as they go. David Lopez delivers more of his open, expressive art here, filling the issue with awesome choreography and rad character acting. [...] All-New Wolverine is a worthy successor to the franchise. It blends the familiar and the fresh with style and keeps fans engaged the entire issue. Congratulations, Laura; you're earning the codename "Wolverine." Jesse Schedeen of IGN gave All-New Wolverine #1 a grade of 8.5, saying, "As much as this series is new in the sense that a completely different character is calling herself Wolverine, the book also reads like a return to basics. This issue is a solid start to a promising new series. [...] The Wolverine franchise has finally found its bearing, and all it took was a completely new character underneath that distinctive mask. This first issue is lean and fast-paced, tossing readers right into the heat of battle and proving the former X-23 worthy of inheriting the mantle of Wolverine." Chase Magnett of Comicbook.com included the All-New Wolverine comic book series in their "10 Best X-23 Comics" list.

X-23 - 2018 
According to Diamond Comic Distributors, X-23 #1 was the 9th best selling comic book in July 2018.

Joshua Davison of Bleeding Cool stated, "The comic has some good emotional beats to it as well, and, on the whole, it is an excellent continuation of the All-New Wolverine title. [...] X-23 #1 was a promising and thoroughly entertaining new start to for Laura and Gabby Kinney. Their dialogue is wonderful, and this first arc seems like it will be an interesting dive into the characters and their ethos. This one earns a recommendation. Give it a read." Jesse Schedeen of IGN gave X-23 #1 a grade of 8.2 out of 10, writing, "Of the many comics revealed as part of Marvel's Fresh Start relaunch, X-23 seemed the least appealing at first glance. Not because of the character herself or the creative team, but the title and what it implies about the character's future. These past few years have been a boon to Laura Kinney, allowing her to rise above her tragic origins and embrace the legacy of her "father." [...] How well this new series can thrive with the return of Wolverine remains to be seen, but for now X-23 is off to a promising start. The series is hardly the departure from All-new Wolverine it seemed initially, and it thrives on the same keen visual style and strong dynamic between Laura and Gabby." Chase Magnett of Comicbook.com included the X-23 comic book series in their "10 Best X-23 Comics" list.

Other versions

X-Men: The End
In the future presented in the X-Men: The End series of books, Laura Kinney is an adult, and a prominent member of the X-Men and the X-Treme Sanctions Executive (XSE) Laura, M, and Iceman are sent to Hong Kong to locate and capture the renegade XSE member, Sage. However, Sage uses her considerable espionage skills to ambush Laura, attaching a mysterious collar to her neck that temporarily overwhelms Laura. Sage removes the collar and attempts to flee just as Iceman arrives and freezes her in ice, allowing the group to safely take her into custody.

Laura, Marvel Girl, M, and Wolverine are sent by Cyclops to locate the whereabouts of Mister Sinister, Gambit, and the missing Summers and LeBeau children. The group finds Sinister's hidden base but are immediately immobilized by an attack from the Ladies Mastermind. The team members live out fantasy existences until Wolverine breaks them free of the mind control. Charging deeper into the base, the group fights against Sinister's Marauders to save the children. Later, Laura and the X-Men travel to Shi'ar space, and a massive battle ensues. She is one of the very few X-Men who survive and is seen attending to Kitty Pryde's speech at the end of the story (see X-Men: The End). Strangely, she not only appears to have an adamantium skeleton, but her muscle tissue appear robotic or techno-organic.

In this reality, it is shown that she is in love with Fantomex, and it is revealed during an illusion caused by the Ladies Mastermind that her dream is for them to be married as a normal suburban couple with a daughter.

"Age of Apocalypse"
A version of Laura Kinney is revealed to exist in the alternate timeline of 2005 miniseries X-Men: Age of Apocalypse, who goes by the name Kirika. She was found in one of Mister Sinister's labs after it was liberated by Magneto. At the end of the miniseries, it was revealed that she was the biologic daughter of Weapon X (Wolverine) and Mariko Yashida. Unlike her Earth-616 counterpart, she has three claws on her hands, with adamantium having been grafted on by Magneto at her request. She is killed during the events of "The Dark Angel Saga" by the now-crazed AoA version of Wolverine, as her team and X-Force from Earth-616 try to free Gateway.

Marvel Team-Up: League of Losers
Laura Kinney features in an arc of Robert Kirkman's Marvel Team-Up (vol. 3), featuring a group of C-list heroes dubbed "The League of Losers". A group of heroes including Laura Kinney, Darkhawk, Dagger, Araña, Gravity, Sleepwalker, Speedball, and Terror (although Araña dies along the way) go to the future to prevent the villain Chronok from stealing Reed Richards' time machine; Chronok came to the present after already having killed all of Marvel's major heroes. It is revealed Chronok is from the same time period as Kirkman's Mutant 2099; the group stays with him and his mentor Reed Richards to wait for Chronok, and during this time Laura sparks a relationship with Gravity. They defeat Chronok, but at the end of the story, Richards reveals they cannot go back to their present, due to time travel and alternate timelines. The group decides to stay in the future, satisfied with the impact they made, however unnoticed. Mutant 2099 suggests reforming the Avengers or the "Fantastic Nine". Due to the Marvel Universe's method for resolving time travel paradoxes, this story occurred in an alternate universe.

Infinity Warp
During Infinity Wars, when the universe was folded in half, Laura Kinney was fused with Scarlet Witch to create Weapon Hex. The Evolutionaries, an occult and scientific group, had been using mutants in order for one of them to become a vessel for Mephicton (fusion of Mephisto and Chthon). However, this process always resulted in the mutants death. Seeing that their plan was failing, the group's leaders, Sarah Kinney and Herbert Wyndham decided to conceive a flawed child to act as the perfect vessel for the demon. However, Sara raised Laura and told her about empathy and humanity, while Herbert wanted the girl to be a weapon. At the age of seventeen, Laura along with Hellhound (fusion of Magik and Sabretooth) were sent on missions. Following her mother's death and discovering that she had a younger sister named Gavrill (fusion of Quicksilver and Honey Badger), she decided to escape the Evolutionaries along with her sister, but was cut in pieces by Hellhound, while Herbert took Gavrill in order for her to become the new vessel for Mephicton. Laura eventually healed and killed both Hellhound and Herbert with the latter being attacked by the spirits who had died from his experiments. After that, Laura along with her sister left the place.

Venomverse
In Edge of Venomverse, a version of X23 got bonded to the Venom symbiote while she was trying to escape the facility where both of them were held. She befriends some street kids and shares her symbiote with them. When the facility tried to capture Laura, she got heavily injured and the symbiote got its pieces from the kids so it could heal her faster. Suddenly she's approached by a Venomized Captain America to join the Venom-army to fight the Poisons. She battled alongside the other Venoms and in the end she returned to her universe.

Old Woman Laura
In a possible future, the world is a veritable utopia, with the majority of the supervillain population imprisoned or retired. An elderly Laura has passed on the Wolverine identity to Gabby, and has learned that a genetic defect will soon lead to her death. While initially content to live out the remainder of her life in peace, Laura is spurred back into action when she learns Bellona is being held captive by Doctor Doom (the only villain still active). Laura leads a strike team into Latveria to rescue Bellona, but is captured by Doom. When Doom reveals that he plans to transfer his mind into Laura's body, Laura reveals her condition, and kills him when he escapes back into his own body.<ref>All-New Wolverine #33-35</ref>

In other media
Television
 Laura Kinney / X-23 appears in Wolverine and the X-Men, voiced by Tara Strong. Introduced in the episode "Stolen Lives", this version is mute and displays a desire to fight Wolverine. In a vision of the future depicted in the series finale "Foresight", Wolverine finds four clones frozen in a Weapon X facility and awakens them to help him and Professor X defeat a group of Sentinels.
 Laura Kinney / X-23 makes a non-speaking cameo appearance in The Super Hero Squad Show episode "Too Many Wolverines!". This version was created by Egghead.

Film
 Laura Kinney / X-23 makes a cameo appearance in Hulk vs. Wolverine as an infant among hundreds of clones in a Weapon X research facility.
 Laura / X-23 appears in Logan, portrayed by Dafne Keen. In February 2017, producer Simon Kinberg stated that the post-credits scene of X-Men: Apocalypse, in which the Essex Corporation acquires James "Logan" Howlett / Wolverine's blood, correlates with how Alkali-Transigen eventually acquires DNA and begins creating clones for use as weapons. This version is an eleven-year-old girl created from Logan's DNA who inherited her genetic donor's bone claws and advanced regenerative capabilities. Additionally, she was one of several mutant children who had been slated for termination when Transigen created X-24, an adult double of Wolverine that has been programmed to be loyal to them, until Transigen nurse Gabriela Lopez helped her escape. Despite her young age, Laura proves to be a formidable opponent, single-handedly fending off detachments of Reavers on several occasions. With Logan's help, she eventually escapes across the border to Canada, though Logan is killed in battle against X-24, subsequently dying in Laura's arms.
 Logan director James Mangold has stated that he would like to see Laura appear in a future Logan follow-up, tentatively titled Laura, and that he would like to be involved in one way or another, should that happen. Kinberg has also stated that 20th Century Fox's plans for future movies do include the character. On October 24, 2017, Mangold confirmed in an interview with The Hollywood Reporter that a script for a Laura spin-off film is in the works, stating: "We're just working on a script." He had also cited the success of Warner Bros. and DC Films' Wonder Woman as inspiration. It was subsequently announced that Laura Kinney creator Craig Kyle would be involved alongside Mangold. However, in March 2019, after Disney's purchase of Fox, an executive from the latter Emma Watts described The New Mutants as the final film in the X-Men series, which has left the future of the Laura film in doubt.
 Laura appears in The New Mutants via archive footage from Logan.

Video games
 Laura Kinney / X-23 appears as a boss in the Game Boy Advance version of X-Men: The Official Game. This version has no memory of her past and traveled to a facility at Alkali Lake in an attempt to remember who she is. When the X-Men arrive, she believes they are trying to kidnap her until she is defeated, after which the two parties part ways on good terms.
 Laura Kinney / X-23 appears as a playable character in Marvel vs. Capcom 3: Fate of Two Worlds and Ultimate Marvel vs. Capcom 3, voiced again by Tara Strong. Additionally, her outfit from X-Men: Evolution appears as an alternate DLC costume.
 Laura Kinney / Wolverine appears as an unlockable character in Marvel: Avengers Alliance.
 Laura Kinney appears in Marvel: War of Heroes.
 Laura Kinney makes a minor appearance in Marvel Pinball as a part of Wolverine's table.
 Laura Kinney appears in Marvel Heroes, voiced again by Tara Strong.
 The All-New Wolverine incarnation of Laura Kinney / Wolverine appears as a playable character in Marvel Contest of Champions.
 Laura Kinney / Wolverine appears as a playable character in Marvel Future Fight.
 Laura Kinney / Wolverine appears as a playable character in Marvel Puzzle Quest.
 Laura Kinney / X-23 appears as a playable character in the IOS and android versions of Marvel Strike Force.
 Laura Kinney / X-23 appears as a purchasable outfit in Fortnite: Battle Royale''.

Collected editionsNYXInnocence Lost (Volume 1)Target X (Volume 2)Volume 3All-New, All-DifferentVolume 4'''

References

External links

 Laura Kinney / X-23 / Wolverine at Marvel.com
 UncannyXmen.net Spotlight on Laura Kinney / X-23 / Wolverine

 
Characters created by Christopher Yost
Comics characters introduced in 2003
Clone characters in comics
Female characters in animation
Fictional assassins in comics
Fictional female assassins
Fictional characters with superhuman senses
Fictional child prostitutes
Fictional child soldiers
Fictional female sex workers
Fictional fist-load fighters
Fictional genetically engineered characters
Fictional matricides
Fictional child slaves
Fictional super soldiers
Fictional women soldiers and warriors
Marvel Comics American superheroes
Marvel Comics characters with accelerated healing
Marvel Comics characters with superhuman strength
Marvel Comics characters who can move at superhuman speeds
Marvel Comics female superheroes
Marvel Comics film characters
Marvel Comics martial artists
Marvel Comics mutants
Wolverine (comics) characters
X-Men: Evolution characters
X-Men members